Mark Andrew Coombes (born 19 April 1978) is a former English cricketer.  Coombes was a left-handed batsman who bowled left-arm medium pace.  He was born in Bristol.

Coombes represented the Gloucestershire Cricket Board 2 in List A cricket matches.  The first of these came against the Yorkshire Cricket Board in the 1999 NatWest Trophy.  His second and final List A match for the Board came in 2002, against the Surrey Cricket Board in the 1st round of the 2003 Cheltenham & Gloucester Trophy which was played in 2002.  In his 2 List A matches, he scored 97 runs at a batting average of 48.50, with a single half century high score of 97.

References

External links
Mark Coombes at Cricinfo
Mark Coombes at CricketArchive

1978 births
Living people
Cricketers from Bristol
English cricketers
Gloucestershire Cricket Board cricketers